Kingsbridge is a market town and tourist hub in the South Hams district of Devon, England, with a population of 6,116 at the 2011 census. Two electoral wards bear the name of Kingsbridge (East & North). Their combined population at the above census was 4,381.  It is situated at the northern end of the  Kingsbridge Estuary, a ria that extends to the sea six miles south of the town. It is the third largest settlement in the South Hams and is 17 miles (27 km) southwest of Torquay and 17 miles (27 km) southeast of Plymouth.

History

The town formed around a bridge which was built in or before the 10th century between the royal estates of Alvington, to the west, and Chillington, to the east, hence giving it the name of Kyngysbrygge ("King's bridge").  In 1219 the Abbot of Buckfast was granted the right to hold a market there, and by 1238 the settlement had become a borough.  The manor remained in possession of the abbot until the Dissolution of the Monasteries, when it was granted to Sir William Petre. Kingsbridge was never represented in Parliament or incorporated by charter, the local government being by a portreeve.  It lay within the hundred of Stanborough.

Kingsbridge is in fact a combination of two towns, Kingsbridge and Dodbrooke.  Dodbrooke was granted its own market in 1257 and had become a borough by 1319. While Dodbrooke was originally considered to be the dominant of the two, Kingsbridge later expanded to include it.  The town consists of two ecclesiastical parishes: St. Edmund's in the west and St. Thomas Becket at Dodbrooke in the east. St. Edmund's Church, in mainly Perpendicular style, retains some 13th-century features including a font, but was enlarged and reconsecrated around 1414 and was mostly rebuilt in the 19th century. The parish church of St. Thomas Becket displays a particularly well-preserved rood screen, restored in 1897.

In 1798 the town mills were converted into a woollen manufactory, which produced large quantities of cloth, and serge manufacture was introduced early in the 19th century.  During the 19th century the town had an active coastal shipping trade, shipbuilding, a tannery, other industries and a large monthly cattle market.  The chief exports were cider, corn, malt, and slate.

Kingsbridge was used by Anthony Trollope as the setting for his novel Rachel Ray (1863) and by Rachel Joyce as the setting for her 2012 novel The Unlikely Pilgrimage of Harold Fry. In October 2021 Embankment Films started filming in Kingsbridge for the big screen version of  The Unlikely Pilgrimage of Harold Fry, starring Jim Broadbent, Penelope Wilton, Monika Gossmann and Bethan Cullinane. The film is due to be released in 2022.

The town centre retains many 18th and 19th century buildings. The Shambles, or market arcade, was rebuilt in 1796 but retains its 16th century granite piers.  The former grammar school, now a museum, was founded and built by Thomas Crispin in 1670.

Modern day
Kingsbridge has been the main market town in the area for centuries. Being situated within the South Devon Area of Outstanding Natural Beauty (AONB) and with its proximity to the south Devon coast and sailing venues such as Salcombe, the town has developed into a popular tourist destination. Its attractions include several restaurants, pubs, a cinema housed in the old Kingsbridge Town Hall building, and a museum devoted to the chemist William Cookworthy who was born in the town in 1705.

There are two supermarkets in Kingsbridge: a Morrisons and a Tesco Store, which opened in 2010. It also has a large secondary school, Kingsbridge Community College, which has over 1,000 pupils and serves the surrounding area. Kingsbridge was home to "the only nightclub in the South Hams", Coast (which has since closed), with the next nearest club being in Torquay.

The town is linked to Plymouth and Dartmouth by the A379 road, and to Salcombe and Totnes by the A381. For seventy years it had a railway station until the branch line, via South Brent, was closed in 1963 as part of the Beeching cuts. An industrial estate now occupies the site of the former station yard, but a railway bridge and a short section of overgrown embankment can still be seen.

Kingsbridge has its own Parish Council with an elected Town Mayor.

Geography

Twin town
 Weilerbach, 
A twinning arrangement with Isigny-sur-Mer in Normandy, France, ended in 2019 after 58 years.

Cultural associations
A song titled "Farewell to Kingsbridge" was collected by Sabine Baring-Gould at Lydford, Devon. It belongs to the years 1778-80 when soldiers stationed here had to depart for North America.
Bigbury Mint Ltd, based near Plymouth in Devon, has issued two commemorative coins for the town of Kingsbridge. The Kingsbridge Crown is 36mm in diameter, struck in solid silver, hallmarked at the London Assay Office and stamped with the Bigbury Mint makers mark. The obverse of the coin features a royal crown  and a 3-arched bridge over the river Avon. The reverse of the coin features the town clock on the old Kingsbridge Town Hall Building (now the town cinema) along with the Kingsbridge Coat of Arms. The smaller quarter crown coin is struck in copper, 23 mm in diameter and features the same images as the larger crown coin.

Notable residents
 William Cookworthy (1705–1780), the discoverer of English china clay and producer of the first English porcelain, was born in the town.
 John Wolcot (1738–1819), poet and satirist who wrote under the name of "Peter Pindar", was born here.
 George Montagu (1753–1815), naturalist, after whom the bird Montagu's harrier was named, lived before his death at Knowle House, Kingsbridge, having been born in Wiltshire.
 John Scoble (1799– d. after 1867), anti-slavery campaigner in Britain and Canada, was born in Kingsbridge.
 William Henry Squire (1871–1963), composer, was educated in Kingsbridge.
 Vincent Harris (1876–1971), architect, was educated in the town.
 Maurice Fox-Strangways, 9th Earl of Ilchester (1920–2006), RAF officer and nuclear weapons engineer, was educated here.
 Sir William Mitchell (1925–2002), physicist, was born here.
 Mark Ellis (born 1988), professional footballer currently with Tranmere Rovers
 Giselle Ansley (1992–), England and Great Britain hockey player
 William Stone (1900-2009), Last Royal Navy Veteran of the Great War living in the United Kingdom.

See also
 South Hams Hospital

References
 (Some text may have been edited).

Further reading
 Fox, Sarah Prideaux (1874) Kingsbridge Estuary: with rambles in the neighbourhood. Kingsbridge, Devon: Cookworthy Museum, 1982 (reissued)
 --do.-- (1974) Kingsbridge and its Surroundings. Plymouth (England): Printed for the compiler by G. P. Friend (first edition published as "Kingsbridge estuary, with rambles in the neighbourhood")

External links

 Kingsbridge Tourist Information Centre
 

 
Towns in Devon
Market towns in Devon
Civil parishes in South Hams